Jeffrey David Esko, Ph.D.,M.D. (h.c) is currently a Distinguished Professor of Cellular and Molecular Medicine and Co-Director of the Glycobiology Research and Training Center at the University of California, San Diego. His research has focuses on understanding the structure, biosynthesis and biological roles of proteoglycans in mammalian cells and model organisms. Esko popularized proteoglycans through his pioneering genetic and functional studies in cells and model organisms. He discovered the dependence of tumor formation on heparan sulfate, the first small molecule inhibitors of heparan sulfate, the action of proteoglycans as receptors for hepatic lipoprotein clearance and for delivery of therapeutic agents. Esko cofounded Zacharon Pharmaceuticals. He was an editor and author of the first textbook in the Glycobiology field, Essentials of Glycobiology.

Education
Esko received his Ph.D.in Biochemistry at the University of Wisconsin in Madison. After an independent fellowship at the Molecular Biology Institute at the University of California,Los Angeles, he moved to the University of Alabama at Birmingham and then to the Department of Cellular and Molecular Medicine at the University of California, San Diego in 1996 to help build a program in Glycobiology. He has published over 250 scholarly papers, reviews and book chapters and was editor/author of the first textbook in the field, Essentials of Glycobiology (1st and 2nd editions). The 2nd edition of Essentials of Glycobiology is made freely available online and became one of the pioneering textbooks to be distributed electronically.

Early work
Esko’s work has focused on the structure, assembly and function of heparan sulfate proteoglycans for the last 30 years. In the 1980s, Esko was the first to isolate and characterize animal cell mutants altered in the assembly of heparan sulfate. His studies of the mutants revealed regulatory mechanisms that control the composition of glycosaminoglycans in cells. The mutants provided the first genetic evidence showing that heparan sulfate was required for growth factor activation and tumor growth. These cell lines continue to be used by hundreds of laboratories worldwide and they serve as the benchmark for analysis of proteoglycan deficiencies in other systems, including zebrafish, fruit flies, nematodes and mice. Since 1996, Esko has focused on the development of mutant mice bearing conditional mutations in enzymes involved in heparan sulfate assembly. Prof. Esko has developed mass spectrometry methods for identification of proteoglycan core proteins and for characterizing the fine structure of the heparan sulfate chains.

Current Research Interests
Work in his laboratory focuses on the structure, biosynthesis, and function of proteoglycans in development and disease using forward and reverse genetic methods. This includes development of animal models lacking key enzymes involved in proteoglycan assembly; application of genome-wide methods to identify novel genes involved in heparan sulfate assembly; analysis of guanidinylated glycosides that bind to proteoglycans; studies of proteoglycans in lipoprotein metabolism in the liver and macrophages; and studies of proteoglycan-associated receptors with particular emphasis on the vasculature and inflammation. He developed a carrier that exploits proteoglycans for delivery of high molecular weight cargo and used it for enzyme replacement therapy for lysosomal storage disorders. Most recently, he developed a facile method for diagnosis of mucopolysaccharidoses. His work is best described as cross-disciplinary, spanning chemistry, biochemistry, cell biology, genetics, and physiology.

Honors and Boards
His work has been recognized by the Karl Meyer Award (2007), the highest honor from the Society for Glycobiology, the IGO award from the International Glycoconjugate Organization (2011), a MERIT Award from the National Institutes of Health (2000-2010). He won Mizutani research grant in 1995 and 2007 and was recently elected as a Fellow of the American Association for the Advancement of Science. Esko received (January 2010) an honorary doctorate from Uppsala University, Sweden for his outstanding achievement in the field of glycobiology and for being an important collaborator and inspiring partner for Uppsala proteoglycan glycobiologists. He has given several named lectureships, including the Blaffer lecture at MD Anderson and the WALS lecture at the National Institutes of Health. Esko has served on the numerous scientific, advisory, and editorial boards (Journal of Biochemistry, Journal of Biological Chemistry, Journal of Cell Biology, Glycobiology and as an ad hoc reviewer for Proceedings of the National Academy of Sciences, Journal Clinical Investigation, Biochimica Biophysica Acta, Matrix Biology, Nature and Science). Additionally, he served as President of the Society for Glycobiology in 2002-2003 and as Director of the Biomedical Sciences Graduate Program at UCSD.

References

Living people
American biochemists
University of California, San Diego faculty
Year of birth missing (living people)